Plastiras is a former municipality in the Karditsa regional unit, Thessaly, Greece. Since the 2011 local government reform it is part of the municipality Lake Plastiras, of which it is a municipal unit. The municipal unit has an area of 93.166 km2. It was named after the Greek general and Prime Minister Nikolaos Plastiras. Population 2,412 (2011). Lake Plastiras covers a part of the municipal unit.  Its residents are engaged chiefly in agriculture. The seat of the municipality was in Morfovouni.

Subdivisions
The municipal unit Plastiras is subdivided into the following communities (constituent villages in brackets):
Kerasea (Kerasea, Nevropoli)
Lampero (Lampero, Agios Athanasios)
Mesenikolas
Morfovouni (Morfovouni, Razia)
Moschato (Moschato, Agios Nikolaos, Tsardaki)

Population

External links
 Plastiras Lake - Λίμνη Πλαστήρα
 Plastiras on GTP Travel Pages
 Plastiras Lake

References

Populated places in Karditsa (regional unit)

el:Δήμος Λίμνης Πλαστήρα#Πλαστήρα